SM UB-130 was a German Type UB III submarine or U-boat in the German Imperial Navy during World War I. She was commissioned into the German Imperial Navy on 28 June 1918 as SM UB-130.

UB-130 was surrendered to the Allies at Harwich on 26 November 1918 in accordance with the requirements of the Armistice with Germany. Early in 1919 she sank in tow to a French port off Hastings..

Construction

She was built by AG Weser of Bremen and following just under a year of construction, launched at Bremen on 27 May 1918. UB-130 was commissioned later the same year under the command of Kptlt. Heinrich XXXVII Prinz Reuß zu Köstritz. Like all Type UB III submarines, UB-130 carried 10 torpedoes and was armed with a  deck gun. UB-130 had a displacement of  while surfaced and  when submerged. Her engines enabled her to travel at  when surfaced and  when submerged.

References

Notes

Citations

Bibliography 

 

German Type UB III submarines
World War I submarines of Germany
U-boats commissioned in 1918
1918 ships
Ships built in Bremen (state)